Dame Laura Jane Davies,  (born 5 October 1963) is an English female professional golfer. She has achieved the status of her nation's most accomplished female golfer of modern times, being the first non-American to finish at the top of the LPGA money list as well as winning the Ladies European Tour (LET) Order of Merit a record seven times: in 1985, 1986, 1992, 1996, 1999, 2004 and 2006.

As of 2018, Davies has 87 professional wins worldwide, with 20 on the LPGA Tour, including four majors. From 1985 to 2010, she won at least one individual title somewhere in the world every season, except for 2005, and was the first golfer, male or female, to win tournaments on five continents in one year. She is a member of U.S.-based LPGA Tour and a life member of the Ladies European Tour. She was inducted into the World Golf Hall of Fame in 2015.

Amateur career
A native of Coventry, Davies began as an amateur international player for Great Britain, compiling a notable record. She was the 1983 English Intermediate Champion, the 1984 Welsh Ladies Open Stroke Play Champion and the South Eastern Champion in both 1983 and 1984. She was also a member of the Great Britain and Ireland Curtis Cup Team in 1984. She turned professional in 1985.

Professional career
Davies started her professional career on the WPGET (now Ladies European Tour) in 1985 when she won both Rookie of the Year and Order of Merit titles. She subsequently won the Sports Journalists' Association Peter Wilson Trophy as International Newcomer of the Year 1985. She repeated the Order of Merit win in 1986 having won four titles, one of which was the British Women's Open (prior to it becoming a major).

In 1987 she went to the United States and won the U.S. Women's Open in an 18-hole playoff against Ayako Okamoto and JoAnne Carner. It was a victory that led the LPGA to amend its constitution. Davies was not a member of the LPGA Tour, so the LPGA changed its constitution to grant Davies automatic membership. Since 1988 Laura Davies has played on both the LPGA and Ladies European Tours. In 1988 Davies won twice as a rookie on the LPGA Tour, three times on the Ladies European Tour and once in Japan, becoming the first woman ever to win on all three major Tours in the same year.

In 1990 she was a member of the inaugural European Solheim Cup Team. She returned as part of every European team through 2011, the only player to do so. Davies is the all-time leader in points won in the Solheim Cup, breaking the record of Annika Sörenstam by winning a Saturday fourballs match partnered by Melissa Reid on 24 September 2011. Davies went on the increase her record point total to 25 by halving her singles match with Juli Inkster on 25 September 2011, as the Europeans captured the Solheim Cup for the fourth time.

In 1994 she was the first golfer, male or female, to win on five different golf tours in one calendar year: US, Europe, Asia, Japan and Australia. and became the first European player to be ranked unofficial number one in the world. She was named the Sports Journalists' Association Sportswoman of the Year 1995 and 1996.

Davies is the only player to participate in the first 12 Solheim Cup matches (1990–2011) on either the United States or European side.

Davies was part of the LPGA team at the Wendy's 3-Tour Challenge three times between 1994 and 1996.

Her four consecutive victories at the J Golf Phoenix LPGA International between 1994 and 1997 made Davies the first LPGA player to win the same tournament in four consecutive years.

She represented England at the Women's World Cup of Golf in 2005 (with Karen Stupples), 2006 (with Kirsty Taylor) and 2007 (with Trish Johnson). She was a Captain's pick for the International Team at the 2006 Lexus Cup.

In 2004 Davies was the first woman to compete in the men's European Tour, entering the ANZ Championship in Sydney, Australia, playing from the same tees as the men. She failed to make the cut, finishing second to last. She currently holds the LPGA Tour record for most eagles in a season, scoring 19 during the 2004 season.

Davies was the first woman to compete in a European Senior Tour event. She played in the 2018 Shipco Masters in Denmark, from the same tees as her male opponents.

In 2018, aged 55, Davies finished runner up at Bank of Hope Founders Cup on the LPGA Tour, including shooting a Saturday round of 63.

On 15 July 2018, Davies claimed the inaugural U.S. Senior Women's Open at Chicago Golf Club by shooting 16-under-par for a 10-shot victory over fellow Hall of Famer Juli Inkster. Then on 17 October, she made the "senior slam" by following that up by capturing her second senior major, the Senior LPGA Championship at French Lick Resort in Indiana with a score of 8-under-par, a four shot margin over Helen Alfredsson and Silvia Cavalleri.

Other awards and honours
Davies is a Lifetime Member of the Ladies European Tour.

Davies was appointed Member of the Order of the British Empire (MBE) in 1988, Commander of the Order of the British Empire (CBE) in 2000, and Dame Commander of the Order of the British Empire (DBE) in the 2014 Birthday Honours, all for services to golf.

In January 2013, the Golf Writers Association of America announced that Davies would be the year's recipient of the ASAP Sports/Jim Murray Award, which recognises a golfer for "cooperation, quotability and accommodation with the media." The other finalists were Luke Donald and Greg Norman. The award was presented at the annual GWAA dinner at Augusta, Georgia, on 10 April. In February 2015, Davies was announced as one of the first female members of the Royal and Ancient Golf Club of St Andrews.

On 18 April 2016, Davies was appointed the first honorary president of the Parliamentary Golf Group, an all-party organisation of MPs working to improve the state of golf in the United Kingdom. On 12 July 2016, Davies was presented with the "Spirit of Golf" Award from the Golf Foundation in a ceremony at Royal Troon. Davies is the first recipient of the prestigious honour.

Off-course activities

Davies published an autobiography in 1996.

Davies enjoys all sports and is an avid football fan and a Liverpool F.C. supporter. She organises the annual football match at the Evian Masters tournament in France and she has in the past been fined by the Ladies European Tour for watching an England versus Spain European Championship football match on a portable television during the final round of the 1996 Evian Masters in France, a tournament she nevertheless won.

She is also the captain of the Rest of the World team in the annual Rest of the World V Australia cricket match held during the ANZ Ladies Masters.

In 2001, Davies joined the BBC Sport commentary team member at The Open Championship. and has regularly appeared in the commentary box for major golfing events on the BBC.

Davies has built a nine-hole golf course (one full size green and greenside bunker plus nine tees) in the garden of her house.

In 2004, she hosted a celebrity fourball tournament for the charity Sport Relief.

Davies has always had an interest in gambling, having formerly been a bookmaker's assistant, and this interest led to her becoming a racehorse owner.

In 2006 Davies completed a 56-mile charity walk along the Great Wall of China to raise funds for Great Ormond Street Hospital. In 2012, she was named by the Golf Club Managers' Association's Golf Club Management magazine as the 32nd most powerful person in British golf due to her ability to inspire girls and women to play the game.

Football career
In 1997, 33-year-old Davies signed a four-year contract worth $1 as part of a publicity stunt for newly established American soccer team Myrtle Beach Seadawgs in the USISL D-3 Pro League. She played in one league game for the club, a six-minute cameo in a 4–1 loss against New Jersey Imperials on 18 April 1997. The future United States national soccer team international Tim Howard made his away debut in the game. Howard wrote in his book that the Seadawgs had offered a bonus of $500 to any player who could assist Davies score a goal.

Professional wins (87)

LPGA Tour wins (20)

LPGA Tour playoff record (2–8)

Ladies European Tour wins (45)
1985 (1) Belgian Ladies Open
1986 (4) McEwan's Wirral Classic, Greater Manchester Tournament, Women's British Open, La Manga Spanish Open
1987 (1) Italian Ladies' Open
1988 (3) Ford Ladies' Classic, Italian Ladies' Open, Biarritz Ladies Open
1989 (1) Laing Ladies Charity Classic
1990 (1) AGF Biarritz Ladies Open 
1991 (1) Valextra Classic
1992 (3) European Ladies Open, Ladies English Open, BMW Italian Ladies' Open
1993 (1) Waterford Dairies Ladies' English Open
1994 (2) Holiday Ireland Women's Open, The New Skoda Women's Scottish Open
1995 (4) Evian Masters, Guardian Irish Holidays Open, Woodpecker Women's Welsh Open, Wilkinson Sword Ladies' English Open
1996 (3) Evian Masters, Wilkinson Sword Ladies' English Open, Italian Ladies' Open di Sicilia
1997 (2) Ford-Stimorol Danish Open, Hennessy Cup
1998 (1) Chrysler Open
1999 (3) Chrysler Open, McDonald's WPGA Championship, Compaq Open
2000 (1) TSN Ladies World Cup Golf (individual event)
2001 (1) WPGA International Matchplay
2002 (1) P4 Norwegian Masters
2003 (1) ANZ Ladies Masters (co-sanctioned by ALPG Tour)
2004 (1) AAMI Women's Australian Open (co-sanctioned by ALPG Tour)
2006 (1) SAS Masters
2007 (1) UNIQA Ladies Golf Open
2008 (1) UNIQA Ladies Golf Open
2009 (1) Women's Australian Open (co-sanctioned by ALPG Tour)
2010 (5) Pegasus New Zealand Women's Open (co-sanctioned by ALPG Tour), UniCredit Ladies German Open, UNIQA Ladies Golf Open, Open De España Femenino, Hero Honda Women's Indian Open

Note: Davies won the Women's British Open once before it became co-sanctioned by the LPGA Tour in 1994 and recognized as a major championship by the LPGA Tour in 2001 and the Evian Championship (formerly named the Evian Masters) twice before it became co-sanctioned by the LPGA Tour in 2000 and recognized as a major championship by the LPGA Tour in 2013.

LPGA of Japan Tour wins (7)
1988 (1) Itoki Classic
1994 (1) Itoen Ladies Open
1995 (1) Itoen Ladies Open
1996 (2) Satake Japan Classic, Itoen Ladies Open
1999 (1) Takara World Invitational
2001 (1) Itoen Ladies Open

ALPG Tour wins (8)
1993 (1) Australian Ladies Masters
1994 (1) Australian Ladies Masters
2003 (1) ANZ Ladies Masters (co-sanctioned by Ladies European Tour)
2004 (1) AAMI Women's Australian Open (co-sanctioned by Ladies European Tour)
2008 (1) LG Bing Lee Women's NSW Open
2009 (1) Women's Australian Open (co-sanctioned by Ladies European Tour)
2010 (2) Pegasus New Zealand Women's Open (co-sanctioned by Ladies European Tour), Kangaroo Valley Resort Classic

Ladies Asian Golf Tour wins (2)
1993 (1) Thailand Ladies Open
1994 (1) Thailand Ladies Open

Other wins (5)
1996 (1) JCPenney/LPGA Skins Game
1998 (1) JCPenney/LPGA Skins Game
1999 (2) Praia d'El Rey European Cup (Ladies European Tour team event), JCPenney Classic (with John Daly)
2008 (1) Lalla Meryem Cup

Legends Tour wins (4)

Major championships

Wins (4)

1 In an 18-hole playoff: Davies 71, Okamoto 73, Carner 74.

Results timeline
Results not in chronological order before 2019.

^ The Women's British Open replaced the du Maurier Classic as an LPGA major in 2001.
^^ The Evian Championship was added as a major in 2013.

CUT = missed the half-way cut.
WD = withdrew 
NT = no tournament
"T" = tied

Summary

Most consecutive cuts made – 11 (1992 du Maurier – 1994 U.S. Open)
Longest streak of top-10s – 3 (1996 PGA – 1996 du Maurier)

LPGA Tour career summary

official as of 2022 season
* Includes match play and other events without a cut.
1 Davies's earnings of $37,549 at the Honda PTT LPGA Thailand were considered unofficial under LPGA rules and are not included in this total.

Team appearances
Amateur
European Lady Junior's Team Championship (representing England): 1983 (winners), 1984
Curtis Cup (representing Great Britain & Ireland): 1984

Professional
Solheim Cup (representing Europe): 1990, 1992 (winners), 1994, 1996, 1998, 2000 (winners), 2002, 2003 (winners), 2005, 2007, 2009, 2011 (winners)
World Cup (representing England): 2005, 2006, 2007
Lexus Cup (representing International team): 2006
Handa Cup (representing World team): 2013 (winners), 2014, 2015
The Queens (representing Europe): 2015 (playing captain)
European Championships (representing Great Britain): 2018

Solheim Cup record

See also
List of golfers with most Ladies European Tour wins
List of golfers with most LPGA Tour wins
List of golfers with most LPGA major championship wins

References

External links

ThoughtCo. profile

English female golfers
Ladies European Tour golfers
LPGA Tour golfers
Winners of LPGA major golf championships
World Golf Hall of Fame inductees
Solheim Cup competitors for Europe
Dames Commander of the Order of the British Empire
Sporting dames
The Sunday Times Sportswoman of the Year winners
English women's footballers
Footballers from Coventry
Women's association football forwards
Myrtle Beach Seadawgs players
USL Second Division players
English expatriate women's footballers
English expatriate sportspeople in the United States
Expatriate women's soccer players in the United States
Sportspeople from Coventry
People from Ottershaw
1963 births
Living people